Emil Cesar (16 August 1927 – 12 September 2020) was a Slovenian literary historian, editor, and a former professor at the University of Ljubljana.

Life and work 
Emil Cesar was born on 16 August 1927 in Ljubljana as the son of Jernej Cesar, a locomotive engineer from Kal pri Mirni Peči, and Marija Cesar (née Zupančič). He graduated in 1947 and furthered his studies at the University of Ljubljana, where he graduated in Slovene language and literature in 1953. After his graduation he became a middle school teacher. In 1977 he started lecturing contemporary Slovene literature at the Faculty of Education at the University of Ljubljana. He completed his Ph.D. in 1990.

Cesar started publishing literary history articles in 1954. His work focuses on Slovene literature during the period between the two world wars and the literature of Slovene resistance against the Nazi occupation during the Second World War, particularly of Karel Destovnik Kajuh and working class writers. Among his work are also numerous forewords, scientific studies and comments to many a publication of other authors, as well as anthologies from the respective field. From 1982 to 1988 he was the main editor of Obzornik magazine where he emphasized Slovene outlook of the publication.

List of works 
 Karel Destovnik-Kajuh. Življenje in delo. (Pesmi v angl. prev.) (1968)  (Slovene)
 Karel Destovnik-Kajuh (1979)  (Slovene)
 Lovro Kuhar – Prežihov Voranc v narodnoosvobodilnem boju. Koroški fužinar (1980)  (Slovene)
 Lovro Kuhar – Prežihov Voranc v narodnoosvobodilnem boju. Borec (1980)  (Slovene)
 Svitanja: pesništvo ljudske revolucije Jugoslavije 1941–1945 (1982)  (Slovene)
 Boj brez puške (1984)  (Slovene)
 Slovenski marksistični tisk v tujini in knjigarna Horizonti v Parizu. Borec (1989)  (Slovene)
 Dva pomembna prijatelja koroških Slovencev. Vestnik koroških partizanov (1989)  (Slovene)
 Nove najdbe leposlovnih del Boga Flandra –  Klusovega Jože. Borec (1990) 
 Popravek in dopolnilo k izjavam Lovra Kuharja –  Prežihovega Voranca o Ksaverju Mešku. Borec (1990)  (Slovene)
 Miha Klinar in njegova pesniška pričevanja o Koroški. Vestnik koroških partizanov (1991)  (Slovene)
 Svetovna popotnica in pisateljica Alma M. Karlin v partizanih. Borec (1992) 
 Karel Destovnik Kajuh (1993) 
 Pozabljeni Ivan Vuk: 1882–1939. Prešernov koledar (1993) 
 Pisatelj Jože Pahor: ob tridesetletnici njegove smrti. Prešernov koledar (1994)  (Slovene)
 Nova knjiga kratke proze: Med ognji. Delo (1994)  (Slovene)
 Naprej – toda ne pozabimo. Borec (1994)  (Slovene)
 »--- tudi med nas je često zavel ledeni dih smrti ---«: pisatelji – žrtve druge svetovne vojne. Naš koledar (1995)  (Slovene)
 Kako sem na literarnih poteh spoznaval nove in nove ljudi: ob izidu pesmi Antona Medveda. Delo (1995)  (Slovene)
 Slovenska kultura v obdobju okupacije in narodnoosvobodilnega boja: od aprila 1941 do 8. septembra 1943 (1996)  (Slovene)
 Kulturni molk. Naš zbornik (1996)  (Slovene)
 Slovenska oziroma jugoslovanska zveza pri reševanju nemških in avstrijskih pisateljev antifašistov. Naš zbornik (1997)  (Slovene)
 O pesniku Severinu Šaliju in o cenzuri: prispevek k novejši literarnozgodovinski raziskavi slovenske književnosti. Rast (1997)  (Slovene)
 Partizanstvo Mirana Jarca. Rast (1998)  (Slovene)
 Oblike literarnega in organiziranega političnega odpora Lili Novy med okupacijo. Borec (1999)  (Slovene)
 Partizanstvo Mirana Jarca. Rast (1999)  (Slovene)
 Pesnik Ivan Rob v partizanih in njegova smrt. Rast (1999)  (Slovene)
 Klopčičeva »Mati«: v 1943. letu odmevno literarno sporočilo svetu o slovenskem odporu. Rast (2000)  (Slovene)
 Literarnozgodovinski portreti (2000)  (Slovene)
 Narod, ki se bojuje s knjigo, ne more biti premagan: kongres slovenskih kulturnih delavcev v Semiču januarja 1944. Rast (2001)  (Slovene)
 Umolknil je trs: dr. Stanku Vuku – pesniku slovenske zemlje na Zahodu. Borec (2001) 
 Slovenska kultura v obdobju okupacije in narodnoosvobodilnega boja: (od 8. septembra 1943 do 9. maja 1945) (2007)  (Slovene)

References 

 Emil Cesar: Literarnozgodovinski portreti. Novo mesto: Dolenjska založba, 2000.  (Slovene)
 Dušan Mevlja: Emil Cesar – šestdesetletnik. Večer 43, 192 (20. 8. 1987). 5.  (Slovene)

1927 births
20th-century Slovenian historians
Academic staff of the University of Ljubljana
University of Ljubljana alumni
Literary historians
2020 deaths